The Charleston Commercial Historic District encompasses the historic commercial center of Charleston, Arkansas.  Extending along East Main Street (Arkansas Highway 22) between Tilden Street and Arkansas Highway 217, the district includes primarilyl single-story masonry commercial buildings built between 1900 and 1940.  Notable exceptions are the Franklin County Courthouse, Southern District, and the Methodist Episcopal Church.

The district was listed on the National Register of Historic Places in 2008.

See also
National Register of Historic Places listings in Franklin County, Arkansas

References

Buildings designated early commercial in the National Register of Historic Places in Arkansas
Buildings and structures completed in 1900
Franklin County, Arkansas
Historic districts on the National Register of Historic Places in Arkansas
National Register of Historic Places in Franklin County, Arkansas